Ron Maestri is an American former college baseball coach. He was the head coach of the New Orleans Privateers baseball program.  He previously held the same position from 1972–1984 and 2014–2015, also served as the Privateers athletic director from 1979–2000.  In the interim, he held a series of positions in college athletics administration and worked in the front office of the minor league New Orleans Zephyrs before coming out of retirement to briefly fill UNO's coaching vacancy as it transitioned back to Division I.

Head coaching record
The following table reflects Maestri's record as a head coach.

References

Living people
Bradley Braves baseball coaches
Bradley Braves baseball players
Bradley Braves football coaches
High school baseball coaches in the United States
New Orleans Privateers baseball coaches
Year of birth missing (living people)